= Agriculture Appropriation Act of 1905 =

United States federal law

Agricultural Appropriation Act
- Other short titles: Agricultural Appropriation Act of 1906
- Long title: An Act making appropriations for the Department of Agricultural for the fiscal year ending June thirtieth nineteen hundred and six.
- Enacted by: the 58th United States Congress
- Effective: March 3, 1905

Citations
- Public law: 58-188
- Statutes at Large: 33 Stat. 861

Legislative history
- Introduced in the House as H.R. 18329; Senate agreed to amendment on February 14, 1905 (18-34) with further amendment; House agreed to Senate amendment on February 16, 1905 (263-5); Signed into law by President Theodore Roosevelt on March 3, 1905

The United States federal Agriculture Appropriation Act, governing agricultural appropriations for 1906, was signed into law by President Theodore Roosevelt on March 3, 1905. Under the act the Office of Public Road Inquiries and the Division of Tests within the Bureau of Chemistry were merged effective July 1, 1905 to form the Office of Public Roads.
